Pine Belt may refer to:
Pine Belt (Mississippi), a region in southeastern Mississippi 
Pine Belt Southern Railroad, defunct railroad line in Alabama
Pine Belt Arena, multi-purpose arena in Toms River, New Jersey